Amphisbaena mebengokre is a species of worm lizard in the family Amphisbaenidae. The species is endemic to Brazil.

Etymology
The specific name, mebengokre, refers to the Mebêngôkre, an indigenous people of Brazil.

Geographic range
A. mebengokre is found in Goiás state, Brazil.

References

Further reading
Ribeiro, Síria; Sá, Vânia; Santos, Alfredo P., Jr.; Graboski, Roberta; Zaher, Hussam; Guedes, Andrei G.; Andrade, Sheila P.; Vaz-Silva, Wilian (2019). "A new species of the Amphisbaena (Squamata, Amphisbaenidae) from the Brazilian Cerrado with a key for the two-pored species". Zootaxa 4550 (3): 301-320. (Amphisbaena mebengokre, new species).

mebengokre
Reptiles described in 2019
Taxa named by Síria Ribeiro
Taxa named by Vánia Sá
Taxa named by Alfredo P. Santos Jr.
Taxa named by Roberta Graboski
Taxa named by Hussam Zaher
Taxa named by Andrei G. Guedes
Taxa named by Sheila P. Andrade
Taxa named by Wilian Vaz-Silva
Endemic fauna of Brazil
Reptiles of Brazil